Nicolás Ricardo Larcamón (born 11 August 1984) is an Argentine football manager.

Early life
Larcamón was born in La Plata, Argentina to a footballing family: both his father and an uncle played professionally in Argentina. He dreamed of following in their footsteps and rose through the ranks at Los Andes, where he signed a contract and was set to be part of the senior squad. However, after suffering from osteochondritis, Larcamón retired as a player at the age of 22.

After ending his playing career, Larcamón began studying to be a physical education teacher, then took a sharp turn and changed his focus of study to architecture. He spent four years working towards this field before his passion for football won out. Shortly before finishing his architectural studies, Larcamón took an opportunity to coach at the youth club Almafuerte de Temperley. From there, he rose through the coaching ranks: from working with the youth teams at Nueva Chicago and Los Andes, to the reserve team level, and as an assistant coach for the senior squad with Nueva Chicago, working under manager Alejandro Nanía.

Career statistics

References

1984 births
Living people
Argentine football managers
Sportspeople from La Plata
Club Atlético Los Andes footballers
Deportivo Anzoátegui managers
Deportes Antofagasta managers
Huachipato managers
Curicó Unido managers
Club Puebla managers
Club León managers
Venezuelan Primera División managers
Chilean Primera División managers
Liga MX managers
Argentine expatriate football managers
Expatriate football managers in Venezuela
Argentine expatriate sportspeople in Venezuela
Expatriate football managers in Chile
Argentine expatriate sportspeople in Chile
Expatriate football managers in Mexico
Argentine expatriate sportspeople in Mexico